Kadakkarappally is a village in Alappuzha district in the Indian state of Kerala. It is a panchayat which comes under the Cherthala Assembly constituency.

The village is home to Thankey church (St.Mary's Forane Church).

Party

List of ward members of Kadakkarapally 
The Panchayat president is the head of this panchayat. People do not directly elect the president. He or she is elected by the ward members, and can rule for five years with the members' support.

Demographics
 India census, Kadakkarappally had a population of 20,010, of whom 9,813 were male and 10,197 were female.

References

Villages in Alappuzha district